Żochowo Stare  is a village in the administrative district of Gmina Staroźreby, within Płock County, Masovian Voivodeship, in east-central Poland.

Demography
According to the National Population and Housing Census of 2011, the population in the village of Żochowo Stare is 93, of which 48 are women, and 45 are male.

Demographic structure as of March 31, 2011

References

Villages in Płock County